The X Grande Prêmio da Cidade de Rio de Janeiro was a Grand Prix motor race held at Gávea, Rio de Janeiro on 27 March 1949. The race was held over 15 laps and was won by Luigi Villoresi in a Maserati 4CLT. Chico Landi in a Maserati 4CL set fastest lap but retired after an accident.

Classification

References

Rio de Janeiro Grand Prix
Rio de Janeiro Grand Prix
Auto races in Brazil
Brazil sport-related lists